Baby Driver – Music from the Motion Picture is the soundtrack album to the 2017 film of the same name. The soundtrack was released on June 23, 2017, on CD, vinyl and digital music via the Columbia Records imprint, 30th Century Records. The album features a combination of artists, from various decades, including Blur, Run the Jewels, Sky Ferreira, Jon Spencer Blues Explosion, Queen, and Golden Earring.

The film takes its name from "Baby Driver," a song from the Simon & Garfunkel album Bridge over Troubled Water. The song is played during the end credits. Edgar Wright, the film's director and screenwriter, consulted with James Gunn, director of Guardians of the Galaxy Vol. 2, before Vol. 2 released to ensure the two films did not feature the same songs on their soundtracks.

The soundtrack features three original tracks: a cover of "Easy" by Sky Ferreira; "Chase Me" by Danger Mouse (featuring Run the Jewels and Big Boi); and "Was He Slow?" by Kid Koala.

The soundtrack won the Empire Award for Best Soundtrack at the 23rd Empire Awards.

Track listing

Charts

Weekly charts

Year-end charts

Certifications

Lawsuit
In August 2017, Rolan Feld, son of T. Rex lead vocalist Marc Bolan, sued Sony Pictures, Media Rights Capital, and Bambino Films for using the band's song "Debora" without permission. Both parties reportedly settled during a mediation on January 12, 2018.

Baby Driver Volume 2: The Score For a Score
A sequel to the soundtrack was released April 13, 2018, entitled Baby Driver Volume 2: The Score For a Score.  It features several exclusive tracks, remixes, and film dialogue including cuts from Steven Price's previously-unreleased score.

References

External links
 

2017 soundtrack albums
Columbia Records soundtracks
Action film soundtracks